Spes Spartans Catania are an Italian rugby league team based in Catania, Sicily.

History
They were formed in 2010 in the new Italian Rugby League Championship competition, where they finished 3rd.

2022 Squad

Johnny Grasso
Stevie Young
Gaetano Trovato
Federico Re
Manuel Messina
Danilo Zappala
Luka Leone
Giuseppe Frosini
Giulio Forte
Nicola Toro
Mario Camorali
Emiliano Di Maura
Federico Dell'Aria|
Gaetano Fichera
Tommaso Garufi
Daniele Arona
Salvo Carbone
David Hernandes

Coach:
Marco Suaria

References

Italian rugby league teams
Rugby clubs established in 2010
2010 establishments in Italy
Sport in Sicily
Sport in Catania
Catania